Coninx is a surname. Notable people with the surname include:

 Arnout Coninx (1548–1617), printer and bookseller in the city of Antwerp
 Dorian Coninx (born 1994), French triathlete
 Stijn Coninx (born 1957), Belgian film director
 Werner Coninx (1911–1980), Swiss artist and art collector